Performance based contracting (PBC), also known as performance-based logistics (PBL) or performance-based acquisition, is a product and services purchasing strategy used to achieve measurable supplier performance. A PBC approach focuses on developing strategic performance metrics and directly relating contracting payment to performance against these metrics. Common metrics include availability, reliability, maintainability, supportability and total cost of ownership. The primary means of accomplishing this are through incentivized, long-term contracts with specific and measurable levels of operational performance defined by the customer and agreed on by contracting parties. The incentivized performance measures aim to motivate the supplier to implement enhanced practices that offer improved performance and cost effective. This stands in contrast to the conventional transaction-based, or waterfall approach, where payment is related to completion of milestones and project deliverables. In PBC, since a part or the whole payment is tied to the performance of the provider and the purchaser does not get involved in the details of the process, it becomes crucial to define a clear set of requirements to the provider. Occasionally governments fail to define the requirements clearly. This leaves room for providers, either intentionally or unintentionally, to misinterpret the requirements, which creates a game like situation.

Performance-based approaches are widely used within the defense industry, but can be applied across any spend category.

Overview
PBC is about buying performance, not transactional goods and services, through an integrated acquisition and logistics process delivering improved capability to a range of products and services. PBC is a support strategy that places primary emphasis on optimising system support to meet the needs of the user. PBCs delineate outcome performance goals, ensure that responsibilities are assigned, provide incentives for attaining these goals, and facilitate the overall life-cycle management of system reliability, supportability, and total ownership costs.

A PBC in practice involves a contracting agency (who are contracting the work to an external provider) and a contractor (who are responsible for completing the work set out in the contract). Several other parties are often involved, including subcontractors, a legal team and consultants. These parties work for both contracting agency and contractor completing various elements of work associated with contract development, contracted work completion or performance management / measurement.

United States federal law defines performance-based acquisition  and treats it as "the preferred method for acquiring services". The National Defense Authorization Act for Fiscal Year 2001 established an order of precedence for:
performance-based contracting with firm fixed prices
other forms of performance-based contracting
non-performance based contracting.

Implementation
A typical process for implementing a PBC is as follows:

Business Case – a document which reviews potential risks, benefits and other potential impacts of a PBC, usually presented to senior managers to aid in their decision making
Outcomes – a short statement reflecting the desired result or final deliverable of the contract
Measures – define a set of performance measures that collectively measure the organisations performance against the outcome statement
Levels – set performance levels for the performance measures, i.e. how well the contractor needs to perform
Payment – develop a set of payment curves which set out the pay for performance regime i.e. how much the contractor gets paid for their performance level
Incentives – set out a group of incentives that encourage positive behaviours and discourage negative behaviours
Contract – draft, review, workshop and finalise a contract which covers all aspects of the performance, payment and terms and conditions of the relationship
Review – conduct an analysis of the outcomes of the PBC, taking into account the differing definitions of success from the different groups involved in the contract.

Naming
PBC is the name used in Australia, New Zealand and Canada to describe the practice of attaching contract payment to a set of performance metrics. It is commonly known as performance-based logistics in the US and Contracting for Availability or Contractor Logistics Support in the UK. Although it was developed in the US for defence applications, and is most actively applied there, PBC strategies are growing in popularity around the world and in industry sectors other than defence. In particular, PBC frameworks are becoming popular in shipping, transport, health services and the energy sector.

Alternative terms include:
Performance-based life-cycle product support, an alternative name for performance-based logistics 
Contracting for Availability (CfA) 
Contractor Logistics Support (CLS) 
Contracting for Capability (CfC) 
Performance based service acquisition 
Procurement of complex performance (PCP) 
Power-By-The-Hour 
Managed Services (or IT and BPO Business Process Outsourcing contracts)
Facilities management contracts
Outcome Based Contracting,
Pay for Performance (P4P)

Applications

Defence
PBC is widely applied in the Australian defence sector, primarily by the major acquisition and support organisation, the former Defence Materiel Organisation (DMO). It is particularly useful in the defence environment because of the inherent complexity and large scale of the projects. Recently, Australian Defence has initiated an escalation of the use of PBCs with the strategic aims of improving capability outcomes and reducing total cost of ownership. In Australia and the US, PBC frameworks are most commonly applied in a defence context.

In October 2000, US Congress approved an incentive for the use of performance-based contracts, through legislation giving the Department of Defense time-limited authority to treat certain performance-based service contracts as contracts for commercial items, which may be awarded using streamlined procedures under Part 12 of the Federal Acquisition Regulation (FAR). The Defense Department issued regulations to implement the legislative authority, but the Government Accountability Office reported in 2003 (at the end of the period of temporary authorisation) that no tracking mechanism had been put in place and therefore the Department did not know "the extent to which the authority [had] been used". Defense officials estimated that use had been "limited, at best".

PBC frameworks are currently being used in numerous defence-related projects, including:
 BAE Systems Hawk
Boeing Defense, Space & Security
 Eurofighter Typhoon
 Anzac class frigates
 Royal Australian Armoured Corps vehicles
 Collins class submarines 
 GE Aviation
 Lockheed Martin: F-35 Lightning II maintenance contracts "pave the way for a longer-term, Performance Based Logistics agreement for the F-35 program".

Industry
Although it is applied primarily in the defence environment, PBC is becoming more popular in a broader range of private and public sector organisations as they seek to reduce costs and create a closer link between expenditure and performance goals.

Areas outside defence where PBC is applied include:
 Commercial Shipping
 Public Transport
 Health Services
 Energy Generation
 Maintenance, Repair and Overhaul
 Commercial Airlines
 Manufacturing
 IT and Business Process Outsourcing (BPO)
 Facilities Management
Some examples:
 PBC for Australian Road Maintenance. This case study provides insight into road maintenance contracts conducted in Western Australia and New South Wales. In both instances, very positive outcomes are recorded. Another case study related to Performance Based Contracting in Road Maintenance claims that in 2005, 35 countries were employing PBC for Road Maintenance, and in 2006 15 others had implemented a PBC or were investigating its use.

PBC and Sourcing Business Models
Procurement/Sourcing Business Models

A performance-based model is one of seven Sourcing Business Models.
Sourcing Business Models theory is a systems-based approach to structuring supplier relationships. A sourcing business model is a type of business model that is applied to business relationships where more than one party needs to work with another party to be successful. There are seven sourcing business models that range from the transactional to investment-based. The seven models are: Basic Provider, Approved Provider, Preferred Provider, Performance-Based/Managed Services Model, Vested Business Model, Shared Services Model, and Equity Partnership Model. Sourcing business models are targeted for procurement professionals seeking a modern approach for achieving the best fit between buyers and suppliers. Sourcing business model theory is based on a collaborative research effort by the University of Tennessee (UT), the Sourcing Industry Group  (SIG) the Center for Outsourcing Research and Education  (CORE), and World Commerce & Contracting (formerly the International Association for Contracts and Commercial Management, IACCM). Their initial research formed the basis for the 2015 book, Strategic Sourcing in the New Economy: Harnessing the Potential of Sourcing Business Models in Modern Procurement.

Research
There is discussion about the efficacy of PBC as a product support measure. However, there is significant research to suggest that PBC can reduce costs and result in better supplier outputs/performance against metrics than traditional contracting approaches, such as transaction-based contracts.

The U.S. Department of Defense/Air Force/Defense Acquisition University sponsored a research project conducted by the University of Tennessee, looking at the effectiveness of PBC frameworks in defence projects. The study found that projects employing a true PBC framework resulted in substantially lower costs and improved system readiness / capability when compared to non-PBC arrangements. The U.S. Department of Defense has many documented case studies from award-winning PBL contracts.

In addition, a study by Booz Allen Hamilton found that even incorporating a small amount of a PBC framework into weapons system support will create positive results.

In a more general sense, implementing a PBC framework has a broad range of benefits for organisations, contractors and contracting agencies, including:
 Improved contracting for supplier performance against supplier performance metrics
 Possible reduction in Total Cost of Ownership (TCO)
 Ability to forecast cost within contract bounds
 Improved accountability for performance
 Development of a clear understanding of performance requirements
 Promotion of strategic benefits for Contracting Agency and Contractor
 Integration of all contracting aspects in a single set of performance measures
 A 'Fair' contract 
 A greater understanding of life-cycle costs
 Investment in workforce and skills

An international workshop on PBC held in 2014 found both a wide variety of practical applications had been identified for PBC alongside a level of academic interest, but also observed that PBC is "by no means always appropriate".

References

Further reading
 Aerospace Systems Division PBC Handbook 
 Australian Department of Defence - ASDEFCON PBC Template 
 Defence Materiel Organisation (DMO) - Contracting 
 Adapted from - Performance Based Logistics Partnerships: Assessment of Implementation Methodologies for Selected ACAT 1 & 2 Systems AFLMA (Air Force Logistics Management Agency) Report (LM200400700)CAPT Kirk Pettingill and MAJ Michael A Knipper, October 2004
 J. Boyce and A. Banghart, Performance based logistics and project point proof: A study of PBL effectiveness, Defense AT&L: Product Support Issue March–April 2012 - available online from 
 J. Beggs, B. Ertel & M. Jones, Performance-based logistics perspective, Booz-Allen-Hamilton - available online from 
 BAE Systems Australia 2011 - available online from 
 Defence Industry Daily, December 6, 2011 - available online from 
 Defence Materiel Organisation (DMO), Defence Capability Update, 8 June 2012 - available online from 
 Defence Industry Daily, May 19, 2010 - available online from 
 Society for Cost Analysis and Forecasting, Implementing Performance Based Contracting in Through Life Projects, John Scire and Dale Shermon, QinetiQ 
 World Bank, Resource Guide, Performance-based Contracting for the Preservation and Improvement of Road Assets - available online from 
 National Cooperative Highway Research Program, Synthesis 389, Performance-Based Contracting for Maintenance 2009, available online from - 
 Defence Materiel Organisation (DMO) Discussion Paper Contracting ‘Cost’ Models & Performance Based Contracting Concepts, 2010, available online from - 
 T. Jin and P. Wang. Planning performance based contracts considering reliability and uncertain system usage. Journal of the Operational Research Society, vol. 63, 2012, pp. 1467–1478.
 J.S. Kang, X.H. Zhang, J.S. Zhao and H.Z. Teng. Managing Performance Based Contract of Repairable System under Three Replacement Policies. 2013 International Conference on Quality, Reliability, Risk, Maintenance, and Safety Engineering .

Management by type
Contract law